Franco Oppo (2 October 1935 – 14 January 2016) was an Italian composer and scholar.

Born in Nuoro, Oppo studied at the Conservatory of Cagliari, graduating in piano (1958), choral music and choral conducting (1960), and composition (1961). Since 1965 he won several  international composition competitions. He was professor of composition and experimental composition at the Conservatory of Cagliari and professor of music theory at the Cagliari University.

Oppo published various studies and essays, particularly about music semiology  and ethnic music. His studies mainly focused on aleatoric music and on testing new types of notation.

References

External links
 

1935 births
2016 deaths
People from Nuoro
Italian composers
Italian essayists
Male essayists
Academic staff of the University of Cagliari
Italian male non-fiction writers